Episinus is a genus of comb-footed spiders that was first described by Pierre André Latreille in 1809.

Species
 it contains forty-seven species and one subspecies, found worldwide:

E. affinis Bösenberg & Strand, 1906 – India, Russia (Far East), Korea, Taiwan, Japan
E. algiricus Lucas, 1846 – Portugal, Spain, France, Italy, Northwest Africa, Malta?
E. amoenus Banks, 1911 – USA, Mexico
E. angulatus (Blackwall, 1836) – Europe, Turkey, Russia (Europe to West Siberia), Central Asia
E. antipodianus O. Pickard-Cambridge, 1880 – New Zealand
E. baoshanensis Liu, Irfan & Peng, 2019 – China
E. bilineatus Simon, 1894 – South Africa
E. bimucronatus (Simon, 1895) – Venezuela
E. bishopi (Lessert, 1929) – Congo
E. bonjovi Lin & Li, 2021 – China
E. cavernicola (Kulczyński, 1897) – Croatia, Slovenia
E. chikunii Yoshida, 1985 – Japan
E. emanus Levi, 1964 – Panama
E. fontinalis Levy, 1985 – Israel
E. garisus Buckup & Marques, 1992 – Brazil
E. gibbus Zhu & Wang, 1995 – China
E. hickmani Caporiacco, 1949 – Kenya
E. immundus (Keyserling, 1884) – Peru, Brazil
E. implexus (Simon, 1894) – Venezuela
E. israeliensis Levy, 1985 – Israel
E. jiangweni Lin & Li, 2021 – China
E. kitazawai Yaginuma, 1958 – Russia (Kurile Is.), Japan
E. longabdomenus Zhu, 1998 – China
E. macrops Simon, 1903 – Equatorial Guinea, Congo
E. maculipes Cavanna, 1876 – Europe, Algeria, Turkey, Caucasus
Episinus m. numidicus Kulczyński, 1905 – Algeria, Tunisia
E. maderianus Kulczyński, 1905 – Canary Is., Madeira
E. makiharai Okuma, 1994 – Taiwan
E. marignaci (Lessert, 1933) – Angola
E. meruensis Tullgren, 1910 – Tanzania
E. mikhailovi Zamani & Marusik, 2021 – Iran
E. mucronatus (Simon, 1894) – Singapore
E. nanyue Yin, 2012 – China
E. nubilus Yaginuma, 1960 – China, Korea, Taiwan, Japan, Ryukyu Is.
E. pentagonalis Chakrabarti, 2013 – India
E. porteri (Simon, 1901) – Chile, Argentina
E. punctisparsus Yoshida, 1983 – Taiwan
E. rhomboidalis (Simon, 1895) – Malaysia, Myanmar, Singapore
E. similanus Urquhart, 1893 – New Zealand
E. similitudus Urquhart, 1893 – New Zealand
E. taibeli Caporiacco, 1949 – Ethiopia
E. theridioides Simon, 1873 – Spain, France (mainland, Corsica), Italy (Sardinia)
E. tongyani Lin & Li, 2021 – China
E. truncatus Latreille, 1809 (type) – Europe, Turkey, Caucasus, Iran
E. typicus (Nicolet, 1849) – Chile
E. variacorneus Chen, Peng & Zhao, 1992 – China
E. xiushanicus Zhu, 1998 – China
E. yoshidai Okuma, 1994 – Taiwan

Formerly included:

E. bicorniger (Simon, 1894) (Transferred to Janula)
E. bicornis (Thorell, 1881) (Transferred to Janula)
E. bicruciatus (Simon, 1895) (Transferred to Janula)
E. bifrons (Thorell, 1895) (Transferred to Janula)
E. caudifer Dönitz & Strand, 1906 (Transferred to Moneta)
E. coercerveus Roberts, 1978 (Transferred to Moneta)
E. conifer (Urquhart, 1886) (Transferred to Moneta)
E. erythrophthalmus (Simon, 1894) (Transferred to Janula)
E. gratiosus Bryant, 1940 (Transferred to Neopisinus)
E. longipes Keyserling, 1884 (Transferred to Neopisinus)
E. luteolimbatus (Thorell, 1898) (Transferred to Janula)
E. malachinus (Simon, 1895) (Transferred to Janula)
E. marginatus (Thorell, 1898) (Transferred to Janula)
E. minusculus Gertsch, 1936 (Transferred to Chrosiothes)
E. mirabilis (Bösenberg & Strand, 1906) (Transferred to Moneta)
E. modestus (Thorell, 1898) (Transferred to Janula)
E. nebulosus (Simon, 1895) (Transferred to Janula)
E. ocreatus (Simon, 1909) (Transferred to Janula)
E. paiki Seo, 1985 (Transferred to Moneta)
E. pictus (Simon, 1895) (Transferred to Janula)
E. recifensis Levi, 1964 (Transferred to Neopisinus)
E. salobrensis (Simon, 1895) (Transferred to Janula)
E. spinigeroides Zhu & Song, 1992 (Transferred to Moneta)
E. tanikawai Yoshida, 1991 (Transferred to Moneta)
E. taprobanicus (Simon, 1895) (Transferred to Janula)
E. yoshimurai Yoshida, 1983 (Transferred to Moneta)

Nomen dubium
E. americanus Nicolet, 1849

See also
 List of Theridiidae species

References

Araneomorphae genera
Cosmopolitan spiders
Taxa named by Pierre André Latreille
Theridiidae